Bosque de Aragón is a subway station in Gustavo A. Madero borough, in México City Mexico. The station was opened on 15 December 1999.

Ridership

References

External links
 

Mexico City Metro Line B stations
Mexico City Metro stations in Gustavo A. Madero, Mexico City
Railway stations opened in 1999
1999 establishments in Mexico
Accessible Mexico City Metro stations